Scouts to the Rescue is a 1939 Universal film serial directed by Alan James and Ray Taylor. It starred Jackie Cooper and Bill Cody Jr.

Premise
A troop of Boy Scouts use a treasure map to find a stash of counterfeit notes and a lost tribe with a secret Radium deposit.

Cast
 Jackie Cooper as Bruce Scott, leader of the Scout Troop
 David Durand as Rip Rawson
 Bill Cody, Jr. as Skeets Scanlon
 Vondell Darr as Mary Scanlon
 William Ruhl as Hal Marvin, a G-Man on the trail of the counterfeiters
 Sidney Miller as Hermie, a Boy Scout
 Ivan Miller as Turk Mortensen
 Edwin Stanley as Pat Scanlon
 Ralph Dunn as Pug O'Toole, a gangster
 George Regas as Lukolu, high priest of the lost tribe
 Jack Mulhall as Scoutmaster Hale
 Jason Robards, Sr. as Doc, a gangster
 Dick Botiller as Leeka, Leader of Warriors
 Victor Adams as Hurst, a heavy
 Max Wagner as Joe, a henchman

Chapter titles
 Death Rides the Air
 Avalanche of Doom
 Trapped by the Indians
 River of Doom
 Descending Doom
 Ghost Town Menace
 Destroyed by Dynamite
 Thundering Hoofs [sic]
 The Fire God Strikes
 The Battle at Ghost Town
 Hurtling Through Space
 The Boy Scouts' Triumph
Source:

See also
 List of film serials
 List of film serials by studio

References

External links

1939 films
1939 adventure films
American black-and-white films
American children's films
1930s English-language films
Universal Pictures film serials
Films directed by Alan James
Films directed by Ray Taylor
Films about the Boy Scouts of America
American adventure films
Films with screenplays by George H. Plympton
Films with screenplays by Joseph F. Poland
1930s American films